Emiel Boersma (born 25 August 1980 in Amsterdam) is a volleyball player from the Netherlands.

Boersma competes in beach volleyball and forms a team with Bram Ronnes. Together they finished in 9th position at the 2007 World Championships in Gstaad. In a heavy competition with Jochem de Gruijter and Ronnes' brother Gijs they challenged to win a ticket for the 2008 Summer Olympics in Beijing. Both teams achieved the national and international qualification limits, but as only two teams of the same country were able to qualify and the third combination of Reinder Nummerdor and Richard Schuil was not questionable to take the first ticket one of the teams had to be eliminated. Boersma and Ronnes eventually qualified to take part in China.

References

1980 births
Living people
Dutch men's volleyball players
Dutch men's beach volleyball players
Beach volleyball players at the 2008 Summer Olympics
Olympic beach volleyball players of the Netherlands
Sportspeople from Amsterdam